Broomfield is a surname. Notable people with the surname include:

 Ayan Broomfield (born 1997), Canadian tennis player
 Billy Broomfield (born 1945), American politician
 Deon Broomfield (born 1991), American football player
 Fred J. Broomfield (1860–1941), English-born Australian writer
 Herbert Broomfield (1878–unknown), English footballer
 Jack Broomfield (1865–1927), African-American community leader in the early 20th century
 Jody Broomfield (born 1976), Canadian artist
 John Broomfield (1889–1981), Canadian politician
 John Calvin Broomfield (1872–1950), Bishop of the Methodist Protestant Church in the United States
 Matthew Broomfield (fl. 1550), Welsh poet
 Maurice Broomfield (1916–2010), British industrial photographer 
 Nick Broomfield (born 1948), English documentary filmmaker
 Nigel Broomfield (1937–2018), British ambassador
 Robert C. Broomfield (1933–2014), United States judge
 William Broomfield (1922–2019), American politician

See also 

 Bloomfield (surname)

Surnames
English-language surnames
Surnames of English origin
Surnames of British Isles origin